The Australian Constitution (Public Record Copy) Act 1990 is an Act of the Parliament of the United Kingdom, passed in 1990. The purpose of the Act was to allow the Commonwealth of Australia to retain the original copy of the Commonwealth of Australia Constitution Act 1900 (Imp), which the British government had loaned for the celebration in 1988 of the bicentenary of British settlement in Australia.

The Australian government had made a formal request to Queen Elizabeth II for the Act to remain in Australia, as part of the nation's history. However, under the UK's Public Records Act 1958, the original copy of every Act of Parliament had to remain in the Public Record Office in London. Thus the British Parliament passed a new Act to exempt this copy from that requirement, so as to allow the copy to remain with Australia as a gift.

The copy is now displayed in the Federation Gallery at the National Archives of Australia, in Canberra.

External links
 Graeme Powell, "The Quest for the Nation's Title Deeds, 1901-1990" (2005) 54:1 Australian Library Journal 55. Retrieved 2011-06-08.
 National Archives of Australia. Retrieved 2011-08-20.

Australian constitutional law
United Kingdom Acts of Parliament 1990
1990 in Australian law
Acts of the Parliament of the United Kingdom concerning Australia